is a Japanese pop singer. As a teenager under the Sony Music Japan label, she had four top-ten albums, two of which reached number one. Her singles were used as theme songs for animated shows such as Mobile Suit Gundam Seed, Gundam Seed Destiny, and D. Gray-man, as well as being representative of the J-Pop music trend. She has various commercial tie-ins with the anime and games industry, and has also performed in stage musicals and a movie.

Career

Beginnings 
In 1999, Tamaki attended dance school and learned how to perform on stage. She auditioned for Sony Music Japan in 2001 when she was thirteen years old where she performed cover songs of the Destiny's Child hit "Survivor" and "Full Moon Prayer" by Core of Soul. She was selected out of 1,000 applicants and started her career in 2003 with her debut single "Believe" which was an opening song for the anime Mobile Suit Gundam Seed. Her follow-up single, "Realize", was also used in the series. The popularity of the Gundam franchise, and the inclusion of her work within it, helped her gain immediate popularity as a singer. Her first concert performance was opening for T.M.Revolution at the Pacific Media Expo in 2004.  She released her first studio album, Greeting, and was hailed as a J-pop princess.

She graduated from high school in March 2007. Her first greatest hits album was released on November 29, 2006 to mark the event, and she soon began an acting and stage performing career. Her first Japanese tour, "Nami Tamaki Best Concert 'My Graduation'" took place in March 2007.

Record label transfer & "nami" 
In 2008, Nami's live events were in full motion. Nami's fourth album, Don't Stay, was released on April 23, 2008, containing songs from her singles "Brightdown", "Cross Season", and "Winter Ballades", as well as some new tracks. The album did not chart or sell as well as her previous albums. Coinciding with the release, Nami held a special live tour "Anniversary Live 5," which took place in Tokyo and Osaka. A lengthy period with a lack of new material followed after the album's release, although Nami remained occupied with various concerts. Speculation and rumors surfaced about Nami leaving Sony Music Japan to join another record label. During a live performance on September 22, 2008 at "Girls Entertainment vol.1", Nami confirmed the transfer but could not give further details.

The September 2008 monthly issue of her fanclub magazine, "Amour Fan Club", released an official confirmation about the transfer, stating that Nami would be transferring to Universal Music Japan.

Amour Fan Club Manager states:
Debut 5th Year Anniversary was welcomed, Nami moves forward with a jump for her record company transfer to UNIVERSAL-J from Sony Music Records.  Currently, we are earnestly working with the new system. Release time is undecided, but until settlement of assurance we will notify you.

Please continue to support Nami chan !! 

On January 15, 2009, Nami's official website announced the release of "Give Me Up", her first single under the Universal-J label and her 16th career single. The single features a more positive upbeat sound compared to her previous singles.

After the somewhat successful release of "Give Me Up" in January 2009, Nami continued to release new music with the singles "Friends!", "Moshimo Negai ga...", and "Omoide ni naru no?". Universal-J also gave Nami Tamaki the stage name "nami", as opposed to using her full name in kanji. Her first album under Universal-J, "Step", was released on February 24, 2010.

In late 2011, Nami made her second record label transfer to Teichiku Records, a sublabel of Victor Entertainment. Her first two singles with Teichiku Records, "Lady Mind" and "Paradise", were produced by Shinichi Osawa. Her third single with the label, "Real", was released on April 17, 2013. The single included a remake of "Believe" in commemoration of the tenth anniversary of her debut. The title song was produced by nishi-ken, who collaborated with Nami previously for her albums Speciality and Don't Stay.

Anime and game industry 
Nami has a relatively close relationship with the ACG (Anime, Comics, Game) industry, as she contributed to several ACG franchises with her music. Well-known examples of her contributions include those in the Gundam SEED and Gundam SEED Destiny franchise ("Realize", "Believe", "Reason", "Result" and "IDentity"), "Brightdown", an opening song for the anime series D.Gray-man, and "Sanctuary", an opening song for the anime series Kiba.

She also performed the song "Fortune" as the main theme for the PS2 role-playing game Radiata Stories (as well as having a cameo appearance in the Japanese version of the game itself), and "CASTAWAY" as the theme song for a GBA turn-based strategy game, Super Robot Wars J. The release of "CASTAWAY" also featured a cover of the famous theme song "Get Wild" from the anime City Hunter, originally performed by TM Network.

Nami's 16th single, "Give Me Up", was used as the theme song for the anime Yatterman. Another song, "Negai Hoshi", which is included in her 17th single, is the theme song for the new Wii RPG, Arc Rise Fantasia, while her 18th single, "Moshimo Negai ga..." is also the theme song for another Wii RPG, Valhalla Knights: Eldar Saga. Both games were released by Marvelous Entertainment.

Health 

In 2014, Nami announced that she had become frustrated as she was having trouble singing her songs. She then went on to state that she had been struggling with sinitus since a young age and had regularly been receiving treatment, but decided to get surgery to fix the problem. Once recovered, she said that she felt good and no longer had problems. However, in 2015 she was diagnosed with vocal nodules as she had been having pain while singing once again. Tamaki stated that she would be receiving treatment during her current activities and that her plans for her upcoming musical would continue as planned. Due to her condition, she had to cut back her performance set-list while promoting for Everlasting Love.

Discography

Albums

Singles

Sony Music Japan

Universal Music Japan

Teichiku Records

Warner Bros. Home Entertainment Japan

Smile Company

Other compilation songs 
Note: The songs below are tributes to several famous Japanese artists and are not presented in any of Nami Tamaki's singles or albums.
 "Blue Jeans Memory" – Matchy Tribute (January 25, 2006)
 "Storm" – Luna Sea Memorial Cover Album -Re:birth- (December 19, 2007)
 "Tonari no Totoro by Jazzida Grande feat. Nami Tamaki" – Ghibli meets Lovers Reggae (July 8, 2009)

DVDs 
 Believe DVD – November 12, 2003
 Realize DVD – December 17, 2003
 Greeting DVD – May 19, 2004
 Make Progress DVD – July 6, 2005
 NAMI TAMAKI 2nd CONCERT "Make Progress～road to～ – October 5, 2005
 Speciality DVD – August 30, 2006
 NAMI TAMAKI Best CONCERT "My Graduation" – June 13, 2007
 Gundam OP/END COLLECTION Volume2–21st Century – August 25, 2009
 STEP DVD – February 17, 2010
 Monthly NEO Nami Tamaki DVD – February 24, 2011

Performances 

 Concert
 Pacific Media Expo 2004, opening for T.M.Revolution
 FanimeCon 2004, MusicFest event
 Animax Musix Fall 2010
 Musical
 "Sweet Charity" (スウィート・チャリティ) as Charity
 "High School Musical ON STAGE!" (JPN ver.) (ハイスクール・ミュージカルON STAGE!) as Gabriella Montez
 "All Shook Up" (JPN ver.)
 "Anything Goes" as Erma
 Movie
 Lovely Complex (ラブ★コン) as 
 Stageshow
 Sengoku Basara 3 Utage as Oichi
 Musical
 Faust ~The Last Crusade~ as Princess Margarete

Commercial tie-ins

Animation, Comics, and Games (ACG) 
 Gundam Seed, Gundam Seed Destiny and related franchise: "Believe", "Realize", "Reason", "Result", "IDentity" (Collaborated in the Gundam SEED C.E. 73 Δ Astray comic project
 Radiata Stories, a PS2 role-playing game from Square Enix: "Fortune"
 Super Robot Wars J, a GBA turn-based strategy game from Banpresto: "Castaway"
 Kiba: "Sanctuary"
 D.Gray-man: "Brightdown"
 Yattaman (2008 remake version): "Give Me Up"
 Arc Rise Fantasia, a Wii role-playing video game from Marvelous Entertainment: "Negai Hoshi" (願い星)
 Valhalla Knights: Eldar Saga, a Wii ARPG from Marvelous Entertainment: "Moshimo Negai ga..." (もしも願いが．．．)
 Sengoku Basara 3 Utage: "Real"
 Argevollen: "Vivid Telepathy"
 Vampire Holmes: "Everlasting Love"

TV Shows and others 

 Matthew's Best Hit TV: "Shining Star ☆忘れないから☆"
 NTT DoCoMo Commercial: "DreamerS"
 Sports Urugusu: "CROSS SEASON"
 High School Musical 2: "You Are the Music in Me (Japanese version)"
 : "Together"
 Palty Commercial: "Friends!"
 Utastar !! (歌スタ !! ): "Omoide ni naru no?" (思い出になるの？)
 Ultraman Z (tokusatsu show): "Connect the Truth"

Awards 
 The 18th Japan Gold Disc Award (第18回日本ゴールドディスク大賞): New Artist of the Year (2004)

References

External links 
  at Teichiku Records 
  at Smile Company 
 
 
 

1988 births
Japanese women pop singers
Sony Music Entertainment Japan artists
Sony BMG artists
People from Wakayama (city)
Living people
Musicians from Wakayama Prefecture
Anime musicians
21st-century Japanese singers
21st-century Japanese women singers